The Forum Thomanum (styled forum thomanum) is a music educational campus developed from 2002 in Leipzig, Saxony, Germany, as the new home of the Thomanerchor which was founded in 1212. It was conceived in 2002 by Georg Christoph Biller, then Thomaskantor, and others, to provide an internationally oriented innovative campus for a future of the traditional choir which was defined until then by Thomaskirche and Thomasschule.

The campus was inaugurated in 2012, where up to 1,200 boys and young men are given cultural education based on a religious foundation, social competence and democratic standing.

History 

In 2002, Georg Christoph Biller, then Thomaskantor, and others conceived the plan to broaden the education of the Thomanerchor which was founded in 1212 and conducted by Johann Sebastian Bach from 1723. The boys were until then educated at the Thomasschule with boarding facility, to perform mainly in the Thomaskirche. Historic buildings were to be modernised and expanded, and new buildings added. An association to promote the project was founded in 2002.

From the 2000s, the project was realised in steps. In 2003, the Leipzig architects' firm Weis & Volkmann was included in the planning. They were to be connected to the existing  and sports facilities. A project of the city of Leipzig, it has been recognised as innovative and unique in Germany. The city estimated the total investment as Euro 30 million.

The campus was inaugurated in 2012, for the 800th anniversary of the Thomanerchor. Its motto is "" (believing singing learning). Up to 1,200 boys and young men are taught with the goal to raise culturally educated young people with a religious foundation, social competence and democratic standing ("") for a better society.

The idea of a campus became a model for similar projects of city development in Bremen and Nürnberg which were supported by the Bundesministerium für Verkehr, Bau und Stadtentwicklung from 2007 to 2015.

In 2012, the Thomanerchor was awarded a special prize of the Echo Klassik for its international education campus.

Campus
Source:

Day care center
Elementary school and after-school care
Middle school
St. Thomas School
, boarding school
Villa thomana
Academia
 at the edge of Johannapark

References

Further reading

External links 

: Musische Erziehung in herrschaftlichem Ambiente, Campus "Forum Thomanum" in Leipzig (in German) Deutschlandradio, 26 May 2008

Music education organizations
Education in Leipzig
2002 establishments in Germany